Cornelius Clifford (26 February 1888 – 24 December 1961) was a footballer and Gaelic games administrator. His championship career with the Kerry senior team lasted eight seasons from 1912 until 1919.

Life
From Tralee, County Kerry, Clifford was born to Patrick and Hanora Clifford. The son of a businessman, he was educated locally and later inherited the family business becoming head of C. Clifford and Sons, Ltd.

Clifford first played competitive football and hurling with the Tralee Mitchels club. During a hugely successful era for the club, Clifford was a dual player and won three championship medals in each code.

Success at club level saw Clifford join the Kerry senior team and he made his debut during the 1912 championship. Over the course of the next eight seasons he enjoyed much success and won two All-Ireland medals as part of back-to-back successes in 1913 and 1914. He also won five Munster medals.

Honours

Tralee Mitchels

Kerry Senior Football Championship (3): 1907, 1908, 1910
Kerry Senior Hurling Championship (3):  1908, 1911, 1912

Kerry
All-Ireland Senior Football Championship (2): 1913, 1914
Munster Senior Football Championship (5): 1912, 1913, 1914, 1915, 1919

References

1880s births
1961 deaths
Tralee Mitchels Gaelic footballers
Kerry inter-county Gaelic footballers